Iov or IOV may refer to:

 Independent Order of Vikings, an American organization that promotes Swedish culture and language
 Internet of vehicles, a network of connected transport devices and their monitoring systems
 In-Orbit Validation satellites, testbed satellites followed by four IOV Galileo satellites
 Interval of Validity, the range of values for x and y under which a differential equation is valid (see also Method of averaging and Integrating factor)
 Patriarch Job of Moscow (16th century1607), first Patriarch of Moscow and All Russia
 Istituto Oncologico Veneto (Venetian Oncology Institute), the public clinical research centre and hospital specialised on oncology in Veneto, Italy.